Canzibe is a village of 1,000 inhabitants in the Eastern Cape province of South Africa. It is situated near the R61 road (future N2 Wild Coast Toll Route) from Port St. Johns to Mthatha in the Nyandeni Local Municipality, which is part of the OR Tambo District Municipality. As a small village it features some primary schools and a hospital, the Canzibe Hospital.

Economy 
Canzibe is part of one of the poorest areas of South Africa. Unemployment in 2008 was at 92%.

Tourism 

Near Canzibe is the Hluleka Nature Reserve and Hluleka Beach (24 km away), as well as Presely Bay (18 km).

References 

Populated places in the Nyandeni Local Municipality